This is a list of all present and past charter schools in Delaware.

Present

 Academia Charter School (Academia Antonia Alonso)
 Academy of Dover Charter School
 Campus Community School
 Charter School of New Castle
 Charter School of Wilmington
 Delaware Military Academy
 Early College High School - Delaware State University
 EastSide Charter School
 First State Military Academy
 First State Montessori Academy
 Freire Charter School Wilmington
 Gateway Charter School (Gateway Lab)
 Great Oaks Charter School
 Kuumba Academy Charter School
 Las Américas ASPIRA Academy
 MOT Charter School
 Newark Charter School
 Odyssey Charter School
 Polytech High School
 Positive Outcomes Charter School
 Providence Creek Academy
 The Sussex Academy of Arts & Sciences
 Sussex Montessori School
 Thomas Edison Charter School

Past
Delaware Academy of Public Safety and Security  
Delaware College Preparatory Academy 
Georgetown Charter School 
Maurice J. Moyer Academic Institute 
Marion T. Academy Charter School 
Pencader Charter High School
Prestige Academy
Reach Academy for Girls

References

Charter